Holhymenia is a genus in the "true bug" family Coreidae, order Hemiptera. The genus was erected by Amédée Louis Michel Lepeletier and Jean Guillaume Audinet-Serville in 1825. The name is frequently misspelled as "Holymenia", due to an unjustified emendation by Hermann Burmeister ten years after the name was originally published.

References

Anisoscelidini
Coreidae genera
Taxa named by Amédée Louis Michel le Peletier
Taxa named by Jean Guillaume Audinet-Serville